Homeland is an album by Neal Morse. It is a piece that was written for a musical theater production in the early 1990s. Many of the musical themes from this production would later appear on some of the Spock's Beard albums.  This is the twelfth release in the Neal Morse Inner Circle series.

Band
 Neal Morse - Vocals, guitar, keyboards, piano, bass

Track listing
 "Set up for Overture/Son of Mine"
 "Overture/Son of Mine"
 "Set up for Where Will I Go Now"
 "Where Will I Go Now"
 "Set up for Lord of the Flies"
 "Lord of the Flies"
 "Set up for Cut Throat Island/Mother"
 "Cut Throat Island"
 "Mother"
 "Set up for Haiti Rise"
 "Haiti Rise"
 "Set up for What Do They Know?"
 "What Do They Know?"
 "Set up for We Will Better the World"
 "We Will Better the World"
 "Set up for How Can You Love That Man?"
 "How Can You Love That Man?"
 "Set up for The Greatest of Them All"
 "The Greatest of Them All"
 "Set up for Rise Again"
 "Rise Again"
 "Set up for the End Of Homeland"
 "The End Of Homeland"
 "Rise Again Reprise"
 "End Talk"

Neal Morse albums
2007 albums